is a Japanese professional footballer who plays as a forward for J2 League side Júbilo Iwata.

Club career

Goto started his career with Júbilo Iwata. On July 20, he made his first-team debut as a substitute against Tokyo Verdy in the fourth round of the 2022 Emperor's Cup. In February 2023, he was promoted to the senior team just before the 2023 J2 League got underway. On 18 February 2023, he scored a brace against Fagiano Okayama in his professional league debut.

Career statistics

Club
.

Notes

References

External links
Profile at J.League
Profile at Júbilo Iwata

2006 births
Living people
People from Shizuoka Prefecture
Japanese footballers
J2 League players
Júbilo Iwata players
Association football forwards